Humberto Briceño (born 1 June 1928) is a Venezuelan former sports shooter. He competed in three events at the 1952 Summer Olympics.

He is the brother of fellow Venezuelan shooter Germán Briceño.

References

External links
 

1928 births
Possibly living people
Venezuelan male sport shooters
Olympic shooters of Venezuela
Shooters at the 1952 Summer Olympics
Pan American Games bronze medalists for Venezuela
Pan American Games medalists in shooting
Place of birth missing (living people)
Shooters at the 1955 Pan American Games
20th-century Venezuelan people